Richard Treat Williams (born December 1, 1951) is an American actor, writer and aviator who has appeared on film, stage and television in over 120 credits. He first became well known for his starring role in the 1979 musical film Hair, and later also starred in the films Prince of the City, Once Upon a Time in America, The Late Shift and 127 Hours. From 2002 to 2006, he was the lead of the television series Everwood and was nominated for two Screen Actors Guild Awards. He has additionally been nominated for three Golden Globe Awards, two Satellite Awards and an Independent Spirit Award.

Early life and education
Williams was born December 1, 1951 in Rowayton, Connecticut, the son of Marian (née Andrew), an antiques dealer, and Richard Norman Williams, a corporate executive. His maternal great-great-great-grandfather was Senator William Henry Barnum of Connecticut, a third cousin of the showman P. T. Barnum. Williams is a distant relative of Robert Treat Paine, who was a signatory to the Declaration of Independence.

Williams played football in high school. He graduated from the Kent School in Connecticut and Franklin and Marshall College in Pennsylvania.

Career
Williams made his film debut in the 1975 thriller film Deadly Hero. The following year he played a supporting role in The Ritz, a squeaky-voiced private detective looking for his suspect in a gay bathhouse. He came to world attention in 1979, when he starred as George Berger in the Miloš Forman film Hair, which was based on the 1967 Broadway musical. Williams was nominated for a Golden Globe Award for his role in the film. He was featured in the February 1980 edition of Playgirl magazine. He has gone on to appear in over 75 films and several television series. Notable films include: 1941 (1979), Once Upon A Time In America (1984), Dead Heat (1988), Things to Do in Denver When You're Dead (1995) and Deep Rising (1998).

Williams' second Golden Globe nomination was for his starring role in Sidney Lumet's Prince of the City (1981). His third nomination was for his performance as Stanley Kowalski in the television presentation of A Streetcar Named Desire. In 1996, he was nominated for a Best Actor Emmy Award by the Academy of Television Arts & Sciences for his work in The Late Shift, an HBO movie, in which he portrayed agent Michael Ovitz.

In 1996, he played villain Xander Drax in Paramount's big budget comic book adaptation The Phantom, in which Williams' character did his best to take over the world and kill Billy Zane's mysterious superhero.

Williams' career includes numerous stage roles.  He won a Drama League Award for his work in the Broadway revival of Stephen Sondheim's Follies, and another for starring in the off-Broadway production of Captains Courageous.  Other notable Broadway shows include Grease, the Sherman Brothers' Over Here!, Once in a Lifetime, Pirates of Penzance and Love Letters, and off-Broadway, he has appeared in David Mamet's Oleanna and Oh, Hell (at Lincoln Center), Some Men Need Help and Randy Newman's Maybe I'm Doing It Wrong. He premiered the Los Angeles production of Love Letters and appeared in War Letters at the Canon Theatre in Los Angeles.

Williams played leading role as Dr. Andrew Brown in the WB television series Everwood, about a New York City neurosurgeon who moves his family to Colorado. Although the show's ratings were never spectacular, it won critical acclaim and had a devoted following. Williams received two SAG Award nominations (2003 and 2004) for his role on the show.

Williams has made several guest appearances on the ABC drama Brothers & Sisters as David Morton, a friend and potential suitor of Sally Field's character. He starred in the short-lived series Heartland on TNT as Nathaniel Grant, but the series was canceled due to low ratings. He also starred in a Lifetime movie, Staircase Murders, which aired April 15, 2007.

Williams starred in a Hallmark Hall of Fame movie, Beyond the Blackboard, with his former Everwood co-star, Emily VanCamp. It was first broadcast on CBS on April 24, 2011.

Williams appears in the CBS television pilot Peachtree Lines as Mayor Lincoln Rylan. The serial is an examination of political, social and cultural issues in Atlanta.

Williams has also worked as a director, winning two festival awards for directing Texan in Showtime's Chanticleer Films series.
Williams currently plays a role as Mick O' Brien in a Hallmark Channel television series called Chesapeake Shores originally airing August 2016 till current.

He also had a recurring role in Chicago Fire as Kelly Severide's father, Benny Severide until his character's death in season 7.

Williams has authored a children's book, Air Show!, illustrated by Robert Neubecker, published in 2010 by Disney/Hyperion Books). Targeted at an audience of children ages three to seven, the book playfully documents an airshow experience with simple text and bold illustrations of such aircraft as a Boeing B-17, a Pitts Special biplane and the US Navy's Blue Angel F/A-18.

Personal life
In 1969, Williams' high school football coach, who was also a flight instructor, offered to train him in a Piper Super Cub. At age 21, he was a private pilot. Williams became an FAA instrument-rated commercial pilot with privileges in both single engine and multi-engine airplanes as well as rotorcraft helicopter. He holds a type-rating for Cessna Citation jets. He also is certified as a flight instructor. He has owned a Piper Clipped-wing Cub, Piper Cherokee 180, Piper Seneca II and a Piper Navajo Chieftain which is used for family travel between homes.

Williams resides in Park City, Utah and Manchester Center, Vermont with his wife, Pam Van Sant, and two children, Gille and Ellie.

Select theatre credits

Filmography

Theatrical releases

Television series

Television films

References

External links

1951 births
Male actors from Connecticut
American male film actors
American male stage actors
American male television actors
American male voice actors
Franklin & Marshall College alumni
People from Norwalk, Connecticut
Kent School alumni
Living people
Actors from Norwalk, Connecticut
20th-century American male actors
21st-century American male actors
American people of English descent
Commercial aviators
People from Manchester, Vermont